The Periodical and Electronic Press Union is a Greek trade union for journalists employed in the weekly newspapers, magazines and electronic media in Greece.

Founded in 1959, it is a member of the Panhellenic Federation of Journalists' Unions, the European Federation of Journalists and the International Federation of Journalists.

It is the only journalists union in Greece to admit freelancers.

See also

Trade unions in Greece

External links
 Website

International Federation of Journalists
Trade unions in Greece
Trade unions established in 1959
Journalists' trade unions
Greek journalism organizations